Louis Briano (25 February 1891 – 19 December 1966) was a Monegasque sports shooter. He competed in the 50 m pistol event at the 1936 Summer Olympics.

References

1891 births
1966 deaths
Monegasque male sport shooters
Olympic shooters of Monaco
Shooters at the 1936 Summer Olympics
Place of birth missing